Swapnabhoomi is a 1967 Indian Malayalam film, directed by S. R. Puttanna and produced by Rangarajan. The film stars Prem Nazir, Sathyan, Sheela and Kaviyoor Ponnamma in the lead roles. The film had musical score by G. Devarajan. The film is a remake of director's own Kannada movie Belli Moda released in the same year.

Cast
Prem Nazir
Sathyan
Sheela
Kaviyoor Ponnamma
Adoor Bhasi
B. N. Nambiar
Lakshmi

Soundtrack
The music was composed by G. Devarajan and the lyrics were written by Vayalar Ramavarma.

References

External links
 

1967 films
1960s Malayalam-language films
Malayalam remakes of Kannada films